Ta det lugnt ("Take It Easy") is the third album by the Swedish psychedelic rock group Dungen. It was produced by Gustav Ejstes, the lead singer and instrumentalist of the band. Ejstes also recorded and mixed the album.

It was originally released in 2004 by Subliminal Sounds, and re-issued with the mostly instrumental 5-song EP Tyst minut in 2005 by Kemado Records.

Critical reception

Ta det lugnt received critical acclaim, scoring 88 on Metacritic and making it the website's tenth best album in 2004. In March 2009, it was the 43rd best album overall.

Track listing

Tyst Minut EP
The following tracks, released as the Tyst Minut EP, were included with the 2005 U.S. release of this album:

Personnel
Gustav Ejstes - lyrics, music, vocals, guitar, bass guitar, drums, keyboards, fiddle, flute
Reine Fiske - electric guitar on tracks 1-5, 7, 8, 10, 11, and 13, bass guitar on tracks 5, 8, and 13, percussion on track 10
Fredrik Björling - drums on tracks 1 and 3, percussion on track 8
Henrik Nilsson - bass guitar on tracks 1 and 3
Aron Hejdström - saxophone on track 5
Lars-Olof Ejstes - fiddle on tracks 4 and 10
Anna Karin Palm - vocals on track 12
Tiaz Gustavsson - percussion on track 10
Frew Elfineh Taha - voice on track 5

Production
Producer: Gustav Ejstes
Executive producer: Stefan Kéry
Mixing: Gustav Ejstes
Recording: Gustav Ejstes
Engineering: Pierre Carnbrand
Mastering: Thomas Tibert
Cover design: Stefan Kéry and Carl Abrahamsson
Photography: Stefan Kéry and Ida Lauden
Publishing: Sony ATV Music Publishing Scandinavia

References

External links
 

2004 albums
Dungen albums